This is a list of Croatian football transfers for the 2009–10 winter transfer window. Only moves involving at least one Prva HNL club are listed.

Transfers

References

Croatian
2009-10
2009–10 in Croatian football